The Horace Greeley Award is a New England award for public service journalism.

History
It is an annual and regional American journalism award that recognizes excellence in the print media of New England and is named in honor of prominent 19th-century editor and publisher Horace Greeley. It is administered by the New England Press Association in Boston, Massachusetts, and awarded occasionally. The first award was given in 1966 to the Revere Journal.

Winners
Revere Journal (1966) 
Maura J. Casey of the New London Day

References 

American journalism awards
1966 establishments in Massachusetts
Awards established in 1966
Horace Greeley